Wrist station is a passenger station in the centre of Wrist (in the district of Steinburg) in the German state of Schleswig-Holstein. It is on the Hamburg-Altona–Kiel railway and the now disused Itzehoe-Wrist railway. The station is mainly used by commuters. Nearly 500,000 passengers use Wrist station each year. To the south of the station there are numerous parking spaces in the station forecourt, which is also served by some bus routes.

The station was built by the Altona-Kiel Railway Company (Altona-Kieler Eisenbahn-Gesellschaft, AKE) in 1844. It was opened with the railway line on 18 September 1844. The station was connected to the now disused Itzehoe-Wrist railway in 1889. The entrance hall of the station was rebuilt between 1880 and 1895. The railway settlement of Wrist then developed around the station over the years. The railway had a major economic impact on the community, which among other things, led Wrist to merge with the older neighbouring community of Stellau under the same name of Wrist.
 
Three tracks run through the station next to two platforms. One platform is located next to the entrance building and the other two next to an island platform between the tracks.

The station building is for sale because it is no longer needed for operations.

Rail services

The station is served by the following services:

Notes

Railway stations in Schleswig-Holstein
Railway stations in Germany opened in 1844
Steinburg